William James (January 11, 1842 – August 26, 1910) was an American philosopher, historian, and psychologist, and the first educator to offer a psychology course in the United States.
James is considered to be a leading thinker of the late 19th century, one of the most influential philosophers of the United States, and the "Father of American psychology".
 
Along with Charles Sanders Peirce, James established the philosophical school known as pragmatism, and is also cited as one of the founders of functional psychology. A Review of General Psychology analysis, published in 2002, ranked James as the 14th most eminent psychologist of the 20th century.
A survey published in American Psychologist in 1991 ranked James's reputation in second place,
after Wilhelm Wundt, who is widely regarded as the founder of experimental psychology.
James also developed the philosophical perspective known as radical empiricism. James's work has influenced philosophers and academics such as Émile Durkheim, W. E. B. Du Bois, Edmund Husserl, Bertrand Russell, Ludwig Wittgenstein, Hilary Putnam, Richard Rorty, and Marilynne Robinson.

Born into a wealthy family, James was the son of the Swedenborgian theologian Henry James Sr. and the brother of both the prominent novelist Henry James and the diarist Alice James. James trained as a physician and taught anatomy at Harvard, but never practiced medicine. Instead, he pursued his interests in psychology and then philosophy. He wrote widely on many topics, including epistemology, education, metaphysics, psychology, religion, and mysticism. Among his most influential books are The Principles of Psychology, a groundbreaking text in the field of psychology; Essays in Radical Empiricism, an important text in philosophy; and The Varieties of Religious Experience, an investigation of different forms of religious experience, including theories on mind-cure.

Early life 

William James was born at the Astor House in New York City on January 11, 1842. He was the son of Henry James Sr., a noted and independently wealthy Swedenborgian theologian well acquainted with the literary and intellectual elites of his day. The intellectual brilliance of the James family milieu and the remarkable epistolary talents of several of its members have made them a subject of continuing interest to historians, biographers, and critics.

William James received an eclectic trans-Atlantic education, developing fluency in both German and French.  Education in the James household encouraged cosmopolitanism. The family made two trips to Europe while William James was still a child, setting a pattern that resulted in thirteen more European journeys during his life. James wished to pursue painting, his early artistic bent led to an apprenticeship in the studio of William Morris Hunt in Newport, Rhode Island, but his father urged him to become a physician instead. Since this did not align with James's interests, he stated that he wanted to specialize in physiology. Once he figured this was also not what he wanted to do, he then announced he was going to specialize in the nervous system and psychology. James then switched in 1861 to scientific studies at the Lawrence Scientific School of Harvard College.

In his early adulthood, James suffered from a variety of physical ailments, including those of the eyes, back, stomach, and skin. He was also tone deaf.
He was subject to a variety of psychological symptoms which were diagnosed at the time as neurasthenia, and which included periods of depression during which he contemplated suicide for months on end. Two younger brothers, Garth Wilkinson (Wilky) and Robertson (Bob), fought in the Civil War. James himself was an advocate of peace. He suggested that instead of youth serving in the military that they serve the public in a term of service, "to get the childishness knocked out of them." The other three siblings (William, Henry, and Alice James) all suffered from periods of invalidism.

He took up medical studies at Harvard Medical School in 1864 (according to his brother Henry James, the author). He took a break in the spring of 1865 to join naturalist Louis Agassiz on a scientific expedition up the Amazon River, but aborted his trip after eight months, as he suffered bouts of severe seasickness and mild smallpox. His studies were interrupted once again due to illness in April 1867. He traveled to Germany in search of a cure and remained there until November 1868; at that time he was 26 years old. During this period, he began to publish; reviews of his works appeared in literary periodicals such as the North American Review.

James finally earned his MD degree in June 1869 but he never practiced medicine. What he called his "soul-sickness" would only be resolved in 1872, after an extended period of philosophical searching. He married Alice Gibbens in 1878. In 1882 he joined the Theosophical Society.

James's time in Germany proved intellectually fertile, helping him find that his true interests lay not in medicine but in philosophy and psychology. Later, in 1902 he would write: "I originally studied medicine in order to be a physiologist, but I drifted into psychology and philosophy from a sort of fatality. I never had any philosophic instruction, the first lecture on psychology I ever heard being the first I ever gave".

Career 
James interacted with a wide array of writers and scholars throughout his life, including his godfather Ralph Waldo Emerson, his godson William James Sidis, as well as Charles Sanders Peirce, Bertrand Russell, Josiah Royce, Ernst Mach, John Dewey, Macedonio Fernández, Walter Lippmann, Mark Twain, Horatio Alger, G. Stanley Hall, Henri Bergson, Carl Jung, Jane Addams and Sigmund Freud.

James spent almost all of his academic career at Harvard. He was appointed instructor in physiology for the spring 1873 term, instructor in anatomy and physiology in 1873, assistant professor of psychology in 1876, assistant professor of philosophy in 1881, full professor in 1885, endowed chair in psychology in 1889, return to philosophy in 1897, and emeritus professor of philosophy in 1907.

James studied medicine, physiology, and biology, and began to teach in those subjects, but was drawn to the scientific study of the human mind at a time when psychology was constituting itself as a science.  James's acquaintance with the work of figures like Hermann Helmholtz in Germany and Pierre Janet in France facilitated his introduction of courses in scientific psychology at Harvard University.  He taught his first experimental psychology course at Harvard in the 1875–1876 academic year.

During his Harvard years, James joined in philosophical discussions and debates with Charles Peirce, Oliver Wendell Holmes, and Chauncey Wright that evolved into a lively group informally known as The Metaphysical Club in 1872. Louis Menand (2001) suggested that this Club provided a foundation for American intellectual thought for decades to come.  James joined the Anti-Imperialist League in 1898, in opposition to the United States annexation of the Philippines.

Among James's students at Harvard University were Boris Sidis, Theodore Roosevelt, George Santayana, W. E. B. Du Bois, G. Stanley Hall, Ralph Barton Perry, Gertrude Stein, Horace Kallen, Morris Raphael Cohen, Walter Lippmann, Alain Locke, C. I. Lewis, and Mary Whiton Calkins. Antiquarian bookseller Gabriel Wells tutored under him at Harvard in the late 1890s.

His students enjoyed his brilliance and his manner of teaching was free of personal arrogance. They remember him for his kindness and humble attitude. His respectful attitude towards them speaks well of his character.

Following his January 1907 retirement from Harvard, James continued to write and lecture, publishing Pragmatism, A Pluralistic Universe, and The Meaning of Truth.  James was increasingly afflicted with cardiac pain during his last years.  It worsened in 1909 while he worked on a philosophy text (unfinished but posthumously published as Some Problems in Philosophy).  He sailed to Europe in the spring of 1910 to take experimental treatments which proved unsuccessful, and returned home on August 18. His heart failed on August 26, 1910, at his home in Chocorua, New Hampshire.
He was buried in the family plot in Cambridge Cemetery, Cambridge, Massachusetts.

He was one of the strongest proponents of the school of functionalism in psychology and of pragmatism in philosophy.  He was a founder of the American Society for Psychical Research, as well as a champion of alternative approaches to healing. In 1884 and 1885 he became president of the British Society for Psychical Research for which he wrote in Mind and in the Psychological Review.
He challenged his professional colleagues not to let a narrow mindset prevent an honest appraisal of those beliefs.

In an empirical study by Haggbloom et al. using six criteria such as citations and recognition, James was found to be the 14th most eminent psychologist of the 20th century.

Family 
William James was the son of Henry James (Senior) of Albany, and Mary Robertson Walsh. He had four siblings: Henry (the novelist), Garth Wilkinson, Robertson, and Alice.
William became engaged to Alice Howe Gibbens on May 10, 1878; they were married on July 10. They had 5 children: Henry (born May 18, 1879), William (June 17, 1882 – 1961), Herman (born 1884, died in infancy), Margaret (born March 1887) and Alexander (the artist) (born December 22, 1890). Most of William James's ancestors arrived in America from Scotland or Ireland in the 18th century. Many of them settled in eastern New York or New Jersey. All of James's ancestors were Protestant, well educated, and of character. Within their communities, they worked as farmers, merchants, and traders who were all heavily involved with their church. The last ancestor to arrive in America was William James's paternal grandfather also named William James. He came to America from Ballyjamesduff, County Cavan, Ireland in 1789 when he was 18 years old. There is suspicion that he fled to America because his family tried to force him into the ministry. After traveling to America with no money left, he found a job at a store as a clerk. After continuously working, he was able to own the store himself. As he traveled west to find more job opportunities, he was involved in various jobs such as the salt industry and the Erie Canal project. After being a significant worker in the Erie Canal project and helping Albany become a major center of trade, he then became the first Vice-President of the Albany Savings Bank. William James (grandfather) went from being a poor Irish immigrant to one of the richest men in New York. After his death, his son Henry James inherited his fortune and lived in Europe and the United States searching for the meaning of life.

Writings 
William James wrote voluminously throughout his life. A non-exhaustive bibliography of his writings, compiled by John McDermott, is 47 pages long.

He gained widespread recognition with his monumental The Principles of Psychology (1890), totaling twelve hundred pages in two volumes, which took twelve years to complete.  Psychology: The Briefer Course, was an 1892 abridgement designed as a less rigorous introduction to the field. These works criticized both the English associationist school and the Hegelianism of his day as competing dogmatisms of little explanatory value, and sought to re-conceive the human mind as inherently purposive and selective.

President Jimmy Carter's Moral Equivalent of War Speech, on April 17, 1977, equating the United States' 1970s energy crisis, oil crisis and the changes and sacrifices Carter's proposed plans would require with the "moral equivalent of war," may have borrowed its title, much of its theme and the memorable phrase from James's classic essay "The Moral Equivalent of War" derived from his last speech, delivered at Stanford University in 1906, and published in 1910, in which "James considered one of the classic problems of politics: how to sustain political unity and civic virtue in the absence of war or a credible threat..." and which "...sounds a rallying cry for service in the interests of the individual and the nation."

In simple terms, his philosophy and writings can be understood as an emphasis on "fruits over roots," a reflection of his pragmatist tendency to focus on the practical consequences of ideas rather than become mired in unproductive metaphysical arguments or fruitless attempts to ground truth in abstract ways. Ever the empiricist, James believes we are better off evaluating the fruitfulness of ideas by testing them in the common ground of lived experience.

James was remembered as one of America's representative thinkers, psychologist, and philosopher. William James was also one of the most influential writers on religion, psychical research, and self-help. He was told to have a few disciples that followed his writing since they were inspired and enriched by his research.

Epistemology 

James defined true beliefs as those that prove useful to the believer. His pragmatic theory of truth was a synthesis of correspondence theory of truth and coherence theory of truth, with an added dimension. Truth is verifiable to the extent that thoughts and statements correspond with actual things, as well as the extent to which they "hang together," or cohere, as pieces of a puzzle might fit together; these are in turn verified by the observed results of the application of an idea to actual practice.

James held a world view in line with pragmatism, declaring that the value of any truth was utterly dependent upon its use to the person who held it. Additional tenets of James's pragmatism include the view that the world is a mosaic of diverse experiences that can only be properly interpreted and understood through an application of 'radical empiricism.' Radical empiricism, not related to the everyday scientific empiricism, asserts that the world and experience can never be halted for an entirely objective analysis; the mind of the observer and the act of observation affect any empirical approach to truth. The mind, its experiences, and nature are inseparable. James's emphasis on diversity as the default human condition—over and against duality, especially Hegelian dialectical duality—has maintained a strong influence in American culture. James's description of the mind-world connection, which he described in terms of a 'stream of consciousness,' had a direct and significant impact on avant-garde and modernist literature and art, notably in the case of James Joyce.

In "What Pragmatism Means" (1906), James writes that the central point of his own doctrine of truth is, in brief:
Truths emerge from facts, but they dip forward into facts again and add to them; which facts again create or reveal new truth (the word is indifferent) and so on indefinitely. The 'facts' themselves meanwhile are not true. They simply are. Truth is the function of the beliefs that start and terminate among them.Richard Rorty made the contested claim that James did not mean to give a theory of truth with this statement and that we should not regard it as such. However, other pragmatism scholars such as Susan Haack and Howard Mounce do not share Rorty's instrumentalist interpretation of James.

In The Meaning of Truth (1909), James seems to speak of truth in relativistic terms, in reference to critics of pragmatism: "The critic's trouble … seems to come from his taking the word 'true' irrelatively, whereas the pragmatist always means 'true for him who experiences the workings.'"
However, James responded to critics accusing him of relativism, scepticism, or agnosticism, and of believing only in relative truths. To the contrary, he supported an epistemological realism position.

Pragmatism and "cash value" 
Pragmatism is a philosophical approach that seeks to both define truth and resolve metaphysical issues. William James demonstrates an application of his method in the form of a simple story: A live squirrel supposed to be clinging on one side of a tree-trunk; while over against the tree's opposite side a human being was imagined to stand. This human witness tries to get sight of the squirrel by moving rapidly round the tree, but no matter how fast he goes, the squirrel moves as fast in the opposite direction, and always keeps the tree between himself and the man, so that never a glimpse of him is caught. The resultant metaphysical problem now is this: Does the man go round the squirrel or not?James solves the issue by making a distinction between practical meaning. That is, the distinction between meanings of "round." Round in the sense that the man occupies the space north, east, south, and west of the squirrel; and round in the sense that the man occupies the space facing the squirrel's belly, back and sides. Depending on what the debaters meant by "going round," the answer would be clear. From this example James derives the definition of the pragmatic method: to settle metaphysical disputes, one must simply make a distinction of practical consequences between notions, then, the answer is either clear, or the "dispute is idle."

Both James and his colleague, Charles Sanders Peirce, coined the term "cash value":
When he said that the whole meaning of a (clear) conception consists in the entire set of its practical consequences, he had in mind that a meaningful conception must have some sort of experiential "cash value," must somehow be capable of being related to some sort of collection of possible empirical observations under specifiable conditions.A statement's truthfulness is verifiable through its correspondence to reality, and its observable effects of putting the idea to practice. For example, James extends his Pragmatism to the hypothesis of God: "On pragmatic principles, if the hypothesis of God works satisfactorily in the widest sense of the word, it is true. … The problem is to build it out and determine it so that it will combine satisfactorily with all the other working truths."
From this, we also know that "new" truths must also correspond to already existent truths as well.

From the introduction by Bruce Kuklick (1981, p. xiv) to James's Pragmatism:

James went on to apply the pragmatic method to the epistemological problem of truth. He would seek the meaning of "true" by examining how the idea functioned in our lives. A belief was true, he said, if it worked for all of us, and guided us expeditiously through our semihospitable world. James was anxious to uncover what true beliefs amounted to in human life, what their "cash value" was, and what consequences they led to. A belief was not a mental entity which somehow mysteriously corresponded to an external reality if the belief were true. Beliefs were ways of acting with reference to a precarious environment, and to say they were true was to say they were efficacious in this environment. In this sense the pragmatic theory of truth applied Darwinian ideas in philosophy; it made survival the test of intellectual as well as biological fitness.

James's book of lectures on pragmatism is arguably the most influential book of American philosophy. The lectures inside depict his position on the subject. In his sixth lecture, he begins by defining truth as "agreement with reality." With this, James warns that there will be disagreements between pragmatics and intellectualists over the concepts of "agreement" and "reality", the last reasoning before thoughts settle and become autonomous for us. However, he contrasts this by supporting a more practical interpretation that: a true idea or belief is one that we can blend with our thinking so that it can be justified through experiences.

Whereby the agreement of truths with "reality" results in useful outcomes, "the 'reality' with which truths must agree has three dimensions:"

 "matters of fact;"
 "relations of ideas;" and
 "the entire set of other truths to which we are committed."

According to James's pragmatic approach to belief, knowledge is commonly viewed as a justified and true belief. James will accept a view if its conception of truth is analyzed and justified through interpretation, pragmatically. As a matter of fact, James's whole philosophy is of productive beliefs.

Belief in anything involves conceiving of how it is real, but disbelief is the result when we dismiss something because it contradicts another thing we think of as real. In his "Sentiment of Rationality", saying that crucial beliefs are not known is to doubt their truth, even if it seems possible. James names four "postulates of rationality" as valuable but unknowable: God, immorality, freedom, and moral duty.

In contrast, the weak side to pragmatism is that the best justification for a claim is whether it works. However, a claim that does not have outcomes cannot be justified, or unjustified, because it will not make a difference.

When James moves on to then state that pragmatism's goal is ultimately "to try to interpret each notion by tracing its respective practical consequences," he does not clarify what he means by "practical consequences."
On the other hand, his friend, colleague, and another key founder in establishing pragmatist beliefs, Charles S. Peirce, dives deeper in defining these consequences. For Peirce, "the consequences we are concerned with are general and intelligible."
He further explains this in his 1878 paper "How to Make Ideas Clear," when he introduces a maxim that allows one to interpret consequences as grades of clarity and conception.
Describing how everything is derived from perception, Peirce uses the example of the doctrine of transubstantiation to show exactly how he defines practical consequences. Protestants interpret the bread and wine of the Eucharist is flesh and blood in only a subjective sense, while Catholics would label them as actual, and divinely mystical properties of flesh via the "body, blood, soul, and divinity", even with the physical properties remaining as bread and wine in appearance. But to everyone, there can be no knowledge of the wine and bread of the Eucharist unless it is established that either wine and bread possesses certain properties or that anything that is interpreted as the blood and body of Christ is the blood and body of Christ. With this Peirce declares that "our action has exclusive reference to what affects the senses," and that we can mean nothing by transubstantiation than "what has certain effects, direct or indirect, upon our senses."
In this sense, James's pragmatic influencer Peirce establishes that what counts as a practical consequence or effect is what can affect one's senses and what is comprehendible and fathomable in the natural world.

Yet James never "[works] out his understanding of 'practical consequences' as fully as Peirce did," nor does he limit these consequences to the senses like Peirce. It then raises the question: what does it mean to be practical? Whether James means the greatest number of positive consequences (in light of utilitarianism), a consequence that considers other perspectives (like his compromise of the tender and tough ways of thinking),
or a completely different take altogether, it is unclear to truly tell what consequence truly fits the pragmatic standard, and what doesn't. The closest James is able to get in explaining this idea is by telling his audience to weigh the difference it would "practically make to anyone" if one opinion over the other were true, and although he attempts to clarify it, he never specifies nor establishes the method in which one would weigh the difference between one opinion over the other. Thus, the flaw in his argument appears in that it is difficult to fathom how he would determine these practical consequences, which he continually refers to throughout his work, to be measured or interpreted.

Will to believe doctrine 

In William James's 1896 lecture titled "The Will to Believe", James defends the right to violate the principle of evidentialism in order to justify hypothesis venturing. This idea foresaw 20th century objections to evidentialism and sought to ground justified belief in an unwavering principle that would prove more beneficial. Through his philosophy of pragmatism William James justifies religious beliefs by using the results of his hypothetical venturing as evidence to support the hypothesis's truth.  Therefore, this doctrine allows one to assume belief in a god and prove its existence by what the belief brings to one's life.

This was criticized by advocates of skepticism rationality, like Bertrand Russell in Free Thought and Official Propaganda and Alfred Henry Lloyd with The Will to Doubt. Both argued that one must always adhere to fallibilism, recognizing of all human knowledge that "None of our beliefs are quite true; all have at least a penumbra of vagueness and error," and that the only means of progressing ever-closer to the truth is to never assume certainty, but always examine all sides and try to reach a conclusion objectively.

Free will 
In his search for truth and assorted principles of psychology, William James developed his two-stage model of free will. In his model, he tries to explain how it is people come to the making of a decision and what factors are involved in it. He firstly defines our basic ability to choose as free will. Then he specifies our two factors as chance and choice. "James's two-stage model effectively separates chance (the in-deterministic free element) from choice (an arguably determinate decision that follows causally from one's character, values, and especially feelings and desires at the moment of decision)."

James argues that the question of free will revolves around "chance." The idea of chance is that some events are possibilities, things that could happen but are not guaranteed. Chance is a neutral term (it is, in this case, neither inherently positive nor "intrinsically irrational and preposterous," connotations it usually has); the only information it gives about the events to which it applies is that they are disconnected from other things – they are "not controlled, secured, or necessitated by other things" before they happen.
Chance is made possible regarding our actions because our amount of effort is subject to change. If the amount of effort we put into something is predetermined, our actions are predetermined.

Free will in relation to effort also balances "ideals and propensities—the things you see as best versus the things that are easiest to do". Without effort, "the propensity is stronger than the ideal." To act according to your ideals, you must resist the things that are easiest, and this can only be done with effort.
James states that the free will question is therefore simple: "it relates solely to the amount of effort of attention or consent which we can at any time put forth."

Chance is the 'free element,' that part of the model we have no control over. James says that in the sequence of the model, chance comes before choice. In the moment of decision we are given the chance to make a decision and then the choice is what we do (or do not do) regarding the decision.

When it comes to choice, James says we make a choice based on different experiences. It comes from our own past experiences, the observations of others, or: A supply of ideas of the various movements that are … left in the memory by experiences of their involuntary performance is thus the first prerequisite of the voluntary life.What James describes is that once you've made a decision in the past, the experience is stockpiled into your memory where it can be referenced the next time a decision must be made and will be drawn from as a positive solution. However, in his development of the design, James also struggled with being able to prove that free will is actually free or predetermined.

People can make judgements of regret, moral approval and moral disapproval, and if those are absent, then that means our will is predetermined.  An example of this is "James says the problem is a very 'personal' one and that he cannot personally conceive of the universe as a place where murder must happen."
Essentially, if there were no regrets or judgments then all the bad stuff would not be considered bad, only as predetermined because there are no options of 'good' and 'bad'. "The free will option is pragmatically truer because it better accommodates the judgments of regret and morality." Overall, James uses this line of reasoning to prove that our will is indeed free: because of our morality codes, and the conceivable alternate universes where a decision has been regarded different than what we chose.

In "The Will to Believe", James simply asserted that his will was free. As his first act of freedom, he said, he chose to believe his will was free. He was encouraged to do this by reading Charles Renouvier, whose work convinced James to convert from monism to pluralism. In his diary entry of April 30, 1870, James wrote:

I think that yesterday was a crisis in my life. I finished the first part of Renouvier's second Essais and see no reason why his definition of free will—"the sustaining of a thought because I choose to when I might have other thoughts"—need be the definition of an illusion. At any rate, I will assume for the present—until next year—that it is no illusion. My first act of free will shall be to believe in free will.

In 1884, James set the terms for all future discussions of determinism and compatibilism in the free will debates with his lecture to Harvard Divinity School students published as "The Dilemma of Determinism".
In this talk he defined the common terms hard determinism and soft determinism (now more commonly called compatibilism).

Old-fashioned determinism was what we may call hard determinism. It did not shrink from such words as fatality, bondage of the will, necessitation, and the like. Nowadays, we have a soft determinism which abhors harsh words, and, repudiating fatality, necessity, and even predetermination, says that its real name is freedom; for freedom is only necessity understood, and bondage to the highest is identical with true freedom.

James called compatibilism a "quagmire of evasion," just as the ideas of Thomas Hobbes and David Hume—that free will was simply freedom from external coercion—were called a "wretched subterfuge" by Immanuel Kant.

Indeterminism is "the belief in freedom [which] holds that there is some degree of possibility that is not necessitated by the rest of reality."
The word "some" in this definition is crucial in James's argument because it leaves room for a higher power, as it does not require that all events be random. Specifically, indeterminism does not say that no events are guaranteed or connected to previous events; instead, it says that some events are not guaranteed – some events are up to chance. In James's model of free will, choice is deterministic, determined by the person making it, and it "follows casually from one's character, values, and especially feelings and desires at the moment of decision."
Chance, on the other hand, is indeterministic, and pertains to possibilities that could happen but are not guaranteed. James described chance as neither hard nor soft determinism, but "indeterminism":

The stronghold of the determinist argument is the antipathy to the idea of chance ... This notion of alternative possibility, this admission that any one of several things may come to pass is, after all, only a roundabout name for chance.

James asked the students to consider his choice for walking home from Lowell Lecture Hall after his talk:

What is meant by saying that my choice of which way to walk home after the lecture is ambiguous and matter of chance? ... It means that both Divinity Avenue and Oxford Street are called but only one, and that one either one, shall be chosen.

With this simple example, James laid out a two-stage decision process with chance in a present time of random alternatives, leading to a choice of one possibility that transforms an ambiguous future into a simple unalterable past. James's two-stage model separates chance (undetermined alternative possibilities) from choice (the free action of the individual, on which randomness has no effect). Subsequent thinkers using this model include Henri Poincaré, Arthur Holly Compton, and Karl Popper.

Philosophy of religion 

James did important work in philosophy of religion.  In his Gifford Lectures at the University of Edinburgh he provided a wide-ranging account of The Varieties of Religious Experience (1902) and interpreted them according to his pragmatic leanings. Some of the important claims he makes in this regard:
 Religious genius (experience) should be the primary topic in the study of religion, rather than religious institutions—since institutions are merely the social descendant of genius.
 The intense, even pathological varieties of experience (religious or otherwise) should be sought by psychologists, because they represent the closest thing to a microscope of the mind—that is, they show us in drastically enlarged form the normal processes of things.
 In order to usefully interpret the realm of common, shared experience and history, we must each make certain "over-beliefs" in things which, while they cannot be proven on the basis of experience, help us to live fuller and better lives.
 A variety of characteristics can be seen within a single individual. There are subconscious elements that compose the scattered fragments of a personality. This is the reflection of a greater dissociation which is the separation between science and religion.
 Religious Mysticism is only one half of mysticism, the other half is composed of the insane and both of these are co-located in the 'great subliminal or transmarginal region'.

James investigated mystical experiences throughout his life, leading him to experiment with chloral hydrate (1870), amyl nitrite (1875), nitrous oxide (1882), and peyote (1896). James claimed that it was only when he was under the influence of nitrous oxide that he was able to understand Hegel.
He concluded that while the revelations of the mystic hold true, they hold true only for the mystic; for others, they are certainly ideas to be considered, but can hold no claim to truth without personal experience of such. American Philosophy: An Encyclopedia classes him as one of several figures who "took a more pantheist or pandeist approach by rejecting views of God as separate from the world."

Mysticism 
William James provided a description of the mystical experience, in his famous collection of lectures published in 1902 as The Varieties of Religious Experience.
These criteria are as follows
 Passivity – a feeling of being grasped and held by a superior power not under your own control.
 Ineffability – no adequate way to use human language to describe the experience.
 Noetic – universal truths revealed that are unable to be acquired anywhere else.
 Transient – the mystical experience is only a temporary experience.

James's preference was to focus on human experience, leading to his research of the subconscious. This was the entryway for the awakening transformation of mystical states. Mystical states represent the peak of religious experience. This helped open James's inner process to self-discovery.

Instincts 

Like Sigmund Freud, James was influenced by Charles Darwin's theory of natural selection. At the core of James's theory of psychology, as defined in The Principles of Psychology (1890), was a system of "instincts". James wrote that humans had many instincts, even more than other animals. These instincts, he said, could be overridden by experience and by each other, as many of the instincts were actually in conflict with each other.
In the 1920s, however, psychology turned away from evolutionary theory and embraced radical behaviorism.

Theory of emotion 
James is one of the two namesakes of the James–Lange theory of emotion, which he formulated independently of Carl Lange in the 1880s. The theory holds that emotion is the mind's perception of physiological conditions that result from some stimulus.  In James's oft-cited example, it is not that we see a bear, fear it, and run; we see a bear and run; consequently, we fear the bear.  Our mind's perception of the higher adrenaline level, heartbeat, etc. is the emotion.

This way of thinking about emotion has great consequences for the philosophy of aesthetics as well as to the philosophy and practice of education. Here is a passage from his work, The Principles of Psychology, that spells out those consequences:

The theory of emotion was also independently developed in Italy by the anthropologist Giuseppe Sergi.

William James's bear 
From Joseph LeDoux's description of William James's Emotion:
Why do we run away if we notice that we are in danger? Because we are afraid of what will happen if we don't. This obvious answer to a seemingly trivial question has been the central concern of a century-old debate about the nature of our emotions.It all began in 1884 when William James published an article titled "What Is an Emotion?"
The article appeared in a philosophy journal called Mind, as there were no psychology journals yet. It was important, not because it definitively answered the question it raised, but because of the way in which James phrased his response. He conceived of an emotion in terms of a sequence of events that starts with the occurrence of an arousing stimulus (the sympathetic nervous system or the parasympathetic nervous system); and ends with a passionate feeling, a conscious emotional experience. A major goal of emotion research is still to elucidate this stimulus-to-feeling sequence—to figure out what processes come between the stimulus and the feeling.

James set out to answer his question by asking another: do we run from a bear because we are afraid or are we afraid because we run? He proposed that the obvious answer, that we run because we are afraid, was wrong, and instead argued that we are afraid because we run:

Our natural way of thinking about … emotions is that the mental perception of some fact excites the mental affection called emotion, and that this latter state of mind gives rise to the bodily expression. My theory, on the contrary, is that the bodily changes follow directly the perception of the exciting fact, and that our feeling of the same changes as they occur IS the emotion (called 'feeling' by Damasio).

The essence of James's proposal was simple. It was premised on the fact that emotions are often accompanied by bodily responses (racing heart, tight stomach, sweaty palms, tense muscles, and so on; sympathetic nervous system) and that we can sense what is going on inside our body much the same as we can sense what is going on in the outside world. According to James, emotions feel different from other states of mind because they have these bodily responses that give rise to internal sensations, and different emotions feel different from one another because they are accompanied by different bodily responses and sensations. For example, when we see James's bear, we run away. During this act of escape, the body goes through a physiological upheaval: blood pressure rises, heart rate increases, pupils dilate, palms sweat, muscles contract in certain ways (evolutionary, innate defense mechanisms). Other kinds of emotional situations will result in different bodily upheavals. In each case, the physiological responses return to the brain in the form of bodily sensations, and the unique pattern of sensory feedback gives each emotion its unique quality. Fear feels different from anger or love because it has a different physiological signature (the parasympathetic nervous system for love). The mental aspect of emotion, the feeling, is a slave to its physiology, not vice versa: we do not tremble because we are afraid or cry because we feel sad; we are afraid because we tremble and are sad because we cry.

Philosophy of history 
One of the long-standing schisms in the philosophy of history concerns the role of individuals in social change.

One faction sees individuals (as seen in Dickens' A Tale of Two Cities and Thomas Carlyle's The French Revolution, A History) as the motive power of history, and the broader society as the page on which they write their acts. The other sees society as moving according to holistic principles or laws, and sees individuals as its more-or-less willing pawns.  In 1880, James waded into this controversy with "Great Men, Great Thoughts, and the Environment", an essay published in the Atlantic Monthly. He took Carlyle's side, but without Carlyle's one-sided emphasis on the political/military sphere, upon heroes as the founders or overthrowers of states and empires.

A philosopher, according to James, must accept geniuses as a given entity the same way as a biologist accepts as an entity Darwin's "spontaneous variations". The role of an individual will depend on the degree of its conformity with the social environment, epoch, moment, etc.

James introduces a notion of receptivities of the moment. The societal mutations from generation to generation are determined (directly or indirectly) mainly by the acts or examples of individuals whose genius was so adapted to the receptivities of the moment or whose accidental position of authority was so critical that they became ferments, initiators of movements, setters of precedent or fashion, centers of corruption, or destroyers of other persons, whose gifts, had they had free play, would have led society in another direction.

View on spiritualism and associationism 

James studied closely the schools of thought known as associationism and spiritualism. The view of an associationist is that each experience that one has leads to another, creating a chain of events. The association does not tie together two ideas, but rather physical objects.
This association occurs on an atomic level. Small physical changes occur in the brain which eventually form complex ideas or associations. Thoughts are formed as these complex ideas work together and lead to new experiences. Isaac Newton and David Hartley both were precursors to this school of thought, proposing such ideas as "physical vibrations in the brain, spinal cord, and nerves are the basis of all sensations, all ideas, and all motions …"
James disagreed with associationism in that he believed it to be too simple. He referred to associationism as "psychology without a soul"
because there is nothing from within creating ideas; they just arise by associating objects with one another.

On the other hand, a spiritualist believes that mental events are attributed to the soul. Whereas in associationism, ideas and behaviors are separate, in spiritualism, they are connected. Spiritualism encompasses the term innatism, which suggests that ideas cause behavior. Ideas of past behavior influence the way a person will act in the future; these ideas are all tied together by the soul. Therefore, an inner soul causes one to have a thought, which leads them to perform a behavior, and memory of past behaviors determine how one will act in the future.

James had a strong opinion about these schools of thought. He was, by nature, a pragmatist and thus took the view that one should use whatever parts of theories make the most sense and can be proven. Therefore, he recommended breaking apart spiritualism and associationism and using the parts of them that make the most sense. James believed that each person has a soul, which exists in a spiritual universe, and leads a person to perform the behaviors they do in the physical world. James was influenced by Emanuel Swedenborg, who first introduced him to this idea. James stated that, although it does appear that humans use associations to move from one event to the next, this cannot be done without this soul tying everything together. For, after an association has been made, it is the person who decides which part of it to focus on, and therefore determines in which direction following associations will lead. Associationism is too simple in that it does not account for decision-making of future behaviors, and memory of what worked well and what did not. Spiritualism, however, does not demonstrate actual physical representations for how associations occur. James combined the views of spiritualism and associationism to create his own way of thinking. James discussed tender-minded thinkers as religious, optimistic, dogmatic, and monistic. Tough-minded thinkers were irreligious, pessimistic, pluralists, and skeptical. Healthy-minded individuals were seen as natural believers by having faith in God and universal order. People who focused on human miseries and suffering were noted as sick souls.

James was a founding member and vice president of the American Society for Psychical Research.
The lending of his name made Leonora Piper a famous medium. In 1885, the year after the death of his young son, James had his first sitting with Piper at the suggestion of his mother-in-law.
He was soon convinced that Piper knew things she could only have discovered by supernatural means. He expressed his belief in Piper by saying, "If you wish to upset the law that all crows are black, it is enough if you prove that one crow is white. My white crow is Mrs. Piper."
However, James did not believe that Piper was in contact with spirits. After evaluating sixty-nine reports of Piper's mediumship he considered the hypothesis of telepathy as well as Piper obtaining information about her sitters by natural means such as her memory recalling information. According to James the "spirit-control" hypothesis of her mediumship was incoherent, irrelevant and in cases demonstrably false.

James held séances with Piper and was impressed by some of the details he was given; however, according to Massimo Polidoro a maid in the household of James was friendly with a maid in Piper's house and this may have been a source of information that Piper used for private details about James.
Bibliographers Frederick Burkhardt and Fredson Bowers who compiled the works of James wrote "It is thus possible that Mrs. Piper's knowledge of the James family was acquired from the gossip of servants and that the whole mystery rests on the failure of the people upstairs to realize that servants [downstairs] also have ears."

James was convinced that the "future will corroborate" the existence of telepathy.
Psychologists such as James McKeen Cattell and Edward B. Titchener took issue with James's support for psychical research and considered his statements unscientific.
Cattell in a letter to James wrote that the "Society for Psychical Research is doing much to injure psychology".

James's theory of the self 
James's theory of the self divided a person's mental picture of self into two categories: the "Me" and the "I". The "Me" can be thought of as a separate object or individual a person refers to when describing their personal experiences; while the "I" is the self that knows who they are and what they have done in their life. Both concepts are depicted in the statement; "I know it was me who ate the cookie."  He called the "Me" part of self the "empirical me" and the "I" part "the pure Ego". For James, the "I" part of self was the thinking self, which could not be further divided. He linked this part of the self to the soul of a person, or what is now thought of as the mind. Educational theorists have been inspired in various ways by James's theory of self, and have developed various applications to curricular and pedagogical theory and practice.

James further divided the "Me" part of self into: a material, a social, and a spiritual self, as below.

Material self 
The material self consists of things that belong to a person or entities that a person belongs to. Thus, things like the body, family, clothes, money, and such make up the material self. For James, the core of the material self was the body.
Second to the body, James felt a person's clothes were important to the material self. He believed a person's clothes were one way they expressed who they felt they were; or clothes were a way to show status, thus contributing to forming and maintaining one's self-image. Money and family are critical parts of the material self. James felt that if one lost a family member, a part of who they are was lost also. Money figured in one's material self in a similar way. If a person had significant money then lost it, who they were as a person changed as well.

Social self 
Our social selves are who we are in a given social situation. For James, people change how they act depending on the social situation that they are in. James believed that people had as many social selves as they did social situations they participated in. For example, a person may act in a different way at work when compared to how that same person may act when they are out with a group of friends. James also believed that in a given social group, an individual's social self may be divided even further. An example of this would be, in the social context of an individual's work environment, the difference in behavior when that individual is interacting with their boss versus their behavior when interacting with a co-worker.

Spiritual self 
For James, the spiritual self was who we are at our core. It is more concrete or permanent than the other two selves. The spiritual self is our subjective and most intimate self. Aspects of a spiritual self include things like personality, core values, and conscience that do not typically change throughout an individual's lifetime. The spiritual self involves introspection, or looking inward to deeper spiritual, moral, or intellectual questions without the influence of objective thoughts. For James, achieving a high level of understanding of who we are at our core, or understanding our spiritual selves is more rewarding than satisfying the needs of the social and material selves.

Pure ego 
What James refers to as the "I" self. For James, the pure ego is what provides the thread of continuity between our past, present, and future selves. The pure ego's perception of consistent individual identity arises from a continuous stream of consciousness.
James believed that the pure ego was similar to what we think of as the soul, or the mind. The pure ego was not a substance and therefore could not be examined by science.

Notable works 
 The Principles of Psychology, 2 vols. (1890), Dover Publications 1950, vol. 1: , vol. 2: 
 Psychology (Briefer Course) (1892), University of Notre Dame Press 1985: , Dover Publications 2001: 
 Is Life Worth Living? (1895), the seminal lecture delivered at Harvard on April 15, 1895
 The Will to Believe, and Other Essays in Popular Philosophy (1897)
 Human Immortality: Two Supposed Objections to the Doctrine (the Ingersoll Lecture, 1897)
 The Will to Believe, Human Immortality (1956) Dover Publications, 
 Talks to Teachers on Psychology: and to Students on Some of Life's Ideals (1899), Dover Publications 2001: , IndyPublish.com 2005: 
 The Varieties of Religious Experience: A Study in Human Nature (1902), 
 Pragmatism: A New Name for Some Old Ways of Thinking (1907), Hackett Publishing 1981: , Dover 1995: 
 A Pluralistic Universe (1909), Hibbert Lectures, University of Nebraska Press 1996: 
 The Meaning of Truth: A Sequel to "Pragmatism" (1909), Prometheus Books, 1997: 
 Some Problems of Philosophy: A Beginning of an Introduction to Philosophy (1911), University of Nebraska Press 1996: 
 Memories and Studies (1911), Reprint Services Corp: 1992: 
 Essays in Radical Empiricism (1912), Dover Publications 2003, 
 critical edition, Frederick Burkhardt and Fredson Bowers, editors. Harvard University Press 1976:  (includes commentary, notes, enumerated emendations, appendices with English translation of "La Notion de Conscience")
 Letters of William James, 2 vols. (1920)
 Collected Essays and Reviews (1920)
 Ralph Barton Perry, The Thought and Character of William James, 2 vols. (1935), Vanderbilt University Press 1996 reprint:  (contains some 500 letters by William James not found in the earlier edition of the Letters of William James)
 William James on Psychical Research (1960)
 The Correspondence of William James, 12 vols. (1992–2004) University of Virginia Press, 
 "The Dilemma of Determinism"
 William James on Habit, Will, Truth, and the Meaning of Life, James Sloan Allen, ed. Frederic C. Beil, Publisher,

Collections 
 William James: Writings 1878–1899 (1992). Library of America, 1212 p., 
Psychology: Briefer Course (rev. and condensed Principles of Psychology), The Will to Believe and Other Essays in Popular Philosophy, Talks to Teachers and Students, Essays (nine others)
 William James: Writings 1902–1910 (1987). Library of America, 1379 p., 
The Varieties of Religious Experience, Pragmatism, A Pluralistic Universe, The Meaning of Truth, Some Problems of Philosophy, Essays
 The Writings of William James: A Comprehensive Edition (1978). University of Chicago Press, 912 pp., 
Pragmatism, Essays in Radical Empiricism, and A Pluralistic Universe complete; plus selections from other works
 In 1975, Harvard University Press began publication of a standard edition of The Works of William James.

See also 

 "The Moral Philosopher and the Moral Life"
 Psychology of religion
 American philosophy
 List of American philosophers
 William James Lectures
 William James Society

Notes

References

Citations

Sources 
 Essays Philosophical and Psychological in Honor of William James, by his Colleagues at Columbia University (London, 1908)

Further reading 
 James Sloan Allen, ed., William James on Habit, Will, Truth, and the Meaning of Life (2014). Frederic C. Beil, Publisher, 
 Margo Bistis, "Remnant of the Future: William James' Automated Utopia", in Norman M. Klein and Margo Bistis, The Imaginary 20th Century (Karlsruhe: ZKM, 2016).
 Émile Boutroux, William James (New York, 1912)
 Werner Bloch, Der Pragmatismus von James und Schiller nebst Exkursen über Weltanschauung und über die Hypothese (Leipzig, 1913)
 K. A. Busch, William James als Religionsphilosoph (Göttingen, 1911)
 Jacques Barzun. A Stroll with William James (1983). Harper and Row: 
 Deborah Blum. Ghost Hunters: William James and the Search for Scientific Proof of Life After Death (2006). Penguin Press, 
 Wesley Cooper. The Unity of William James's Thought (2002). Vanderbilt University Press, 
 Howard M. Feinstein. Becoming William James (1984). Cornell University Press, 
 Théodore Flournoy, La Philosophie de William James (Saint-Blaise, 1911)
 Sergio Franzese, The Ethics of Energy. William James's Moral Philosophy in Focus, Ontos Verlag, 2008
 Sergio Franzese & Felicitas Krämer (eds.), Fringes of Religious Experience. Cross-perspectives on William James's Varieties of Religious Experience, Frankfurt / Lancaster, ontos verlag, Process Thought XII, 2007
 Peter Hare, Michel Weber, James K. Swindler, Oana-Maria Pastae, Cerasel Cuteanu (eds.), International Perspectives on Pragmatism, Newcastle upon Tyne, Cambridge Scholars Publishing, 2009
 James Huneker, "A Philosophy for Philistines" in his The Pathos of Distance (New York, 1913)
 Henry James, A Small Boy and Others (1913) and Notes of a Son and Brother (1914)
 Amy Kittelstrom, The Religion of Democracy: Seven Liberals and the American Moral Tradition. New York: Penguin, 2015.
 H. V. Knox, Philosophy of William James (London, 1914)
 R. W. B. Lewis The Jameses: A Family Narrative (1991) Farrar, Straus & Giroux
 Louis Menand. The Metaphysical Club: A Story of Ideas in America (2001). Farrar, Straus, and Giroux, .
 Ménard, Analyse et critique des principes de la psychologie de W. James (Paris, 1911) analyzes the lives and relationship between James, Oliver Wendell Holmes Jr., Charles Sanders Peirce, and John Dewey.
 Gerald E. Myers. William James: His Life and Thought (1986). Yale University Press, 2001, paperback: . Focuses on his psychology; includes 230 pages of notes.
 Giuseppe Sergi L'origine dei fenomeni psichici e loro significazione biologica, Milano, Fratelli Dumolard, 1885.
 Giuseppe Sergi Principi di Psicologie: Dolore e Piacere; Storia Naturale dei Sentimenti, Milano, Fratelli Dumolard, 1894.
 James Pawelski. The Dynamic Individualism of William James (2007). SUNY press, .
 R. B. Perry, Present Philosophical Tendencies (New York, 1912)
 Robert D. Richardson. William James: In the Maelstrom of American Modernism (2006). Houghton Mifflin, 
 Robert D. Richardson, ed. The Heart of William James (2010). Harvard U. Press, 
 Jane Roberts. The Afterdeath Journal of an American Philosopher: The View of William James (1978. Prentice-Hall. .)
 Barbara Ross, chapter "William James: A Prime Mover of the Psychoanalytic Movement in America", in Psychoanalysis, Psychotherapy, and the New England Medical Scene: 1894-1944 (Science History Publications, New York, 1978) ISBN 9780882021690 
 Josiah Royce, William James and Other Essays on the Philosophy of Life (New York, 1911)
 J. Michael Tilley, "William James: Living Forward and the Development of Radical Empiricism," In Kierkegaard's Influence on Philosophy: Anglophone Philosophy, edited by Jon Stewart, 2012, Ashgate Publishing, 87–98.
 Linda Simon. Genuine Reality: A Life of William James (1998). Harcourt Brace & Company, 
 Michel Weber. Whitehead's Pancreativism. Jamesian Applications. Ontos Verlag, 2011, 
 Michel Weber, "On Religiousness and Religion. Huxley's Reading of Whitehead's Religion in the Making in the Light of James' Varieties of Religious Experience", Jerome Meckier and Bernfried Nugel (eds.), Aldous Huxley Annual. A Journal of Twentieth-Century Thought and Beyond, Volume 5, Münster, LIT Verlag, March 2005, pp. 117–32.
 Michel Weber, "James's Mystical Body in the Light of the Transmarginal Field of Consciousness", in Sergio Franzese & Felicitas Krämer (eds.), Fringes of Religious Experience. Cross-perspectives on William James's Varieties of Religious Experience, Frankfurt / Lancaster, Ontos Verlag, Process Thought XII, 2007, pp. 7–37.
 Wiseman, R. (2012). Rip it up: The radically new approach to changing your life. London, UK: Macmillan

External links 

 William James Society
 Emory University: William James – major collection of essays and works online
 William James correspondence from the Historic Psychiatry Collection, Menninger Archives, Kansas Historical Society
 Harvard University: Life is in the Transitions: William James, 1842–1910 – online exhibition from Houghton Library
 Stanford Encyclopedia of Philosophy: William James
 William James on Information Philosopher
 Booknotes interview with Linda Simon on Genuine Reality: A Life of William James, June 7, 1998
 William James: Looking for a Way Out
 New York Times obituary
 Works by William James at Project Gutenberg
 
 
 

 
1842 births
1910 deaths
19th-century American philosophers
19th-century American writers
19th-century psychologists
20th-century American philosophers
20th-century American writers
20th-century psychologists
American philosophy academics
American religion academics
Analytic philosophers
American consciousness researchers and theorists
American educational psychologists
Epistemologists
Existentialists
Functionalist psychologists
Harvard Medical School alumni
Harvard School of Engineering and Applied Sciences alumni
Harvard University faculty
Metaphysicians
Mysticism scholars
New Thought people
Ontologists
American parapsychologists
People from Staten Island
Philosophers from New York (state)
Philosophers of history
Philosophers of science
Philosophers of mind
Philosophers of religion
Philosophers of war
Pragmatists
Presidents of the American Psychological Association
Psychedelic drug researchers
Psychologists of religion
Social philosophers
Corresponding Fellows of the British Academy
Philosophers of death
Members of the American Academy of Arts and Letters